Basit Ahmed Bhat (born on  17 February 1998) is an Indian professional footballer who plays as a midfielder for Real Kashmir FC in the I-League.

Career
Basit began his initial vocation by joining a neighbourhood group "Towheed FC" at 16 years old. Then, he played in the top notch division of a neighbourhood club named "Maharaja J&K affiliation club" were he scored eight goals in nine matches. Later on, Ahmed joined Star FC second division for 2016–17 season. After that he joined Jammu and Kashmir Bank Academy U-18 and played I-League scoring two goals against Minerva. He has likewise played for the J&K Bank Football Club senior group in 2019.

In 2017, he was additionally chosen for Spanish Tercera División club SD Lenense. Same year he signed for the Lonestar Kashmir FC and scored two goals in 14 appearances. In 2019 he signed for Kerala Blasters in 2019–2020 and played for their reserve side. He won the 2019-20 season of Kerala Premier League with the reserve side. Basit left the club in 2020 to join Real Kashmir. He made his first ever professional debut on 10 March 2021 against TRAU FC.

Honours
Kerala Blasters Reserves
 Kerala Premier League: 2019–20

References

1998 births
Indian footballers
Association football defenders
Real Kashmir FC players
Living people
Footballers from Jammu and Kashmir
Kerala Blasters FC Reserves and Academy players